This list of Former prizes awarded by the Académie française includes the  which no longer exists (as of 2016).

List of former prizes awarded by the Académie française

History 
 Prix Albéric Rocheron
 Prix Antoine Girard
 Prix Augustin Thierry
 Prix Broquette-Gonin (history), created in 1950, last awarded in 1973.
 Prix Charles Blanc
 Prix Eugène Piccard
 Prix Feydeau de Brou
 Prix Georges Goyau
 Prix Hercule Catenacci
 Prix Jean Walter
 Prix Marie-Eugène Simon-Henri-Marin
 Prix Pierre Gentil
 Prix René Petiet
 Prix Thérouanne nominating laureates, every year from 1869 to 1989.
 Prix Toutain
 Prix Yvan Loiseau
 Prix d'Histoire
 Prix du Baron de Courcel
 Prix du Général Muteau

Literature 
 Prix André Barré, biennial, created in 1954, last awarded in 1984
 Prix Alice-Louis Barthou, annual, created in 1936, last awarded in 1988
 Prix Louis Barthou, annual, created in 1936, last awarded in 1993
 Prix Max Barthou, annual, created in 1936, last awarded in 1988
 Prix Bordin, annual, created in 1935, last awarded in 1988
 Prix Botta, quadriennial, created in 1875, last awarded in 1985
 Prix Boudenoot, quinquennial, created in 1924, last awarded in 1985
 Prix Brieux, biennial, created in 1926, last awarded in 1989
 Prix Broquette-Gonin (literature), created in 1918, last awarded in 1989
 Prix Calmann-Levy, triennial, 1892, last awarded in 1987
 Prix Pol Comiant, triennial, created in 1956, last awarded in 1989
 Prix Dumas-Millier, annual, created in 1955, last awarded in 1988
 Prix Georges Dupau, annual, created in 1938, last awarded in 1989
 Prix Durchon-Louvet, annual, created in 1934, last awarded in 1988
 Prix Estrade-Delcros, quinquennial, created in 1896, last awarded in 1986
 Prix Jules Favre, biennial, created in 1886, last awarded in 1989
 Prix Paul Flat, annual, created in 1919, last awarded in 1989
 Prix Marcelin Guérin, annual, created in 1872, last awarded in 1976
 Prix André Jullien du Breuil, quinquennial, created in 1948, last awarded in 1986
 Prix Gustave Le Métais-Larivière, annual, created in 1947, last awarded in 1985
 Prix Maillé-Latour-Landry, biennial, created in 1839, last awarded in 1984
 Prix M. et Mme Louis Marin, triennial, created in 1976, last awarded in 1993.
 Prix Narcisse Michaut, biennial, created in 1892, last awarded in 1989
 Prix Alfred Née, annual, created in 1893, last awarded in 1988
 Prix Pouchard, annual, created in 1941, last awarded in 1983
 Prix Jean Reynaud, quinquennial, created in 1879, last awarded in 1979
 Prix Roberge, annual, created in 1919, last awarded in 1989
 Prix Saintour, annual, created in 1889, last awarded in 1989
 Prix Anaïs Ségalas, annual, created in 1917, last awarded in 1989
 Prix Sobrier-Arnould, annual, created in 1891, last awarded in 1984
 Prix Lucien Tisserant, annual, created in 1937, last awarded in 1989
 Prix Maurice Trubert, biennial, created in 1921, last awarded in 1982
 Prix Claire Virenque, annual, created in 1961, last awarded in 1987
 Prix Vitet, annual, created in 1873, last awarded in 1989
 Prix J.-J. Weiss, biennial, created in 1910, last awarded in 1988
 Prix Valentine de Wolmar, annual, created in 1960, last awarded in 1989

Philosophy 
 Prix Auguste Furtado
 Prix Broquette-Gonin (philosophy), created in 1917, last awarded in 1963.
 Prix Constant Dauguet
 Prix Dodo
 Prix Fabien
 Prix Halphen
 Prix Henri Dumarest
 Prix Hélène Porgès
 Prix Juteau-Duvigneaux
 Prix Lafontaine
 Prix Louis-Paul Miller
 Prix Maujean
 Prix Nicolas Missarel
 Prix Paul Teissonière
 Prix Véga et Lods de Wegmann
 Prix de Joest
 Prix de Jouy
 Prix du Dr Binet-Sangle

Literature and philosophy
Prix Lambert, established 1853, last awarded 1963

Poetry 
 Prix Anthony Valabrègue
 Prix Archon-Despérouses
 Prix Auguste Capdeville
 Prix Balleroy
 Prix Broquette-Gonin (poetry), created in 1960, last awarded in 1979.
 Prix Capuran
 Prix Henry Jousselin
 Prix Jean Bouscatel
 Prix Kastner-Boursault
 Prix Le Fèvre-Deumier
 Prix Marie Havez-Planque
 Prix Pascal Forthuny
 Prix Paul Labbé-Vauquelin
 Prix René Bardet
 Prix Saint-Cricq-Theis
 Prix Émile Hinzelin

Support for literary creation 
 Prix Aubry-Vitet
 Prix Bonardi
 Prix Lange
 Prix Pierre de Régnier
 Prix Verrière

Translation 
 Prix Jeanne Scialtel
 Prix Langlois

Institut de France 
 Prix d'Aumale

References 

Académie Française awards
Académie française